Patilla Pata is a stratovolcano in the Oruro Department in Bolivia. It is situated in the Sajama Province, in the west of the Curahuara de Carangas Municipality, at the border with Chile. Patilla Pata lies south-west of the mountain Jisk'a Kunturiri, north-east of the lake Q'asiri Quta (Khasiri Kkota) and the mountain Qullqi Warani, west of the little lake Sura Pata, south-east of the mountains Laram Q'awa, Kunturiri and Milluni and south of the little lake named Ch'iyar Quta.

The river Junt'uma K'uchu (Aymara junt'u warm, hot, uma water, k'uchu corner, "warm water corner", Junthuma Khuchu) originates south of Patilla Pata. It flows to the south-east as a right affluent of the Sajama River.

The date of its last eruption is unclear, but it is unlikely to be during the Holocene as the mountain is heavily glaciated. The composition of the volcano is largely andesitic, but there are also a number of basaltic lava flows.

See also
 Jach'a Kunturiri
 Sajama
 List of volcanoes in Bolivia

References

Sources
 

Stratovolcanoes of Bolivia
Subduction volcanoes
Polygenetic volcanoes
Volcanoes of Oruro Department
Volcanoes of La Paz Department (Bolivia)
Pleistocene stratovolcanoes